The Westchester Knicks are an American professional basketball team in the NBA G League based in White Plains, New York, and are affiliated with the New York Knicks. The Knicks typically play their home games at Westchester County Center in White Plains, New York. Due to the ongoing effects of the COVID-19 pandemic, while the Westchester County Center served as a vaccination site, the Westchester Knicks had announced on October 9, 2021 that they would play their 2021–22 season home games at Total Mortgage Arena in Bridgeport, Connecticut. On June 21, 2022 the Westchester Knicks announced that their home games would continue at the Total Mortgage Arena for the 2022–23 season.

The Knicks became the seventh D-League team to be owned by an NBA team and replaced the Erie BayHawks as the Knicks' D-League affiliate.

The Knicks had filed for trademarks for five possible names: New York 914s, New York 'Bockers, New York Plainsmen, New York Empire, and New York Hutch.  On May 14, 2014, the Westchester Knicks name and logo were announced; in addition to retaining the parent club's "Knicks" name, the Knicks had also incorporated the original "Father Knickerbocker" logo (drawn by Willard Mullin) which was in use by the parent Knicks from the team's founding in 1946 until 1964. The logo later changed to the current one, which resembles the New York Knicks' current logo.

History

2014–15 season
On September 3, 2014 The Westchester Knicks acquired 16 players on the 2014 NBA Development League Expansion Draft. On October 13 Kevin Whitted was named as the first coach of Westchester. On November 1, in the 2014 NBA D-League Draft, the Westchester Knicks made second-round guard Joseph Bertrand their first ever selection. On November 16 they made their regular season debut in an 84–91 loss against the local Oklahoma City Blue. Three days later they made their home debut, again losing, this time against the Canton Charge on an 84-88 affair. Their first win came on November 21 against the Grand Rapids Drive in their third game, which they won by 97–83 at home.

On January 7, 2015, Langston Galloway signed a 10-day contract with the New York Knicks, becoming the first player to be called up to the NBA in franchise history.

On March 30, 2015, the Knicks announced via Twitter that head coach Kevin Whitted was relieved of his duties and that assistant coach Craig Hodges would serve as the interim head coach for the final week of the 2014–15 season. The Knicks were 10–36 at the time for Whitted's firing, which was second worst in the Development League. Whitted became the first head coach to be fired in franchise history.

2015–16 season
On October 7, 2015, the Westchester Knicks hired Mike Miller to be their head coach. Previously he served as an assistant coach for the Austin Toros.  On October 27, 2015, the Westchester Knicks hired Coby Karl and Derrick Alston as the assistant basketball coaches.
On October 31, 2015, with the second pick in the NBA D-League draft, The Westchester Knicks drafted Jimmer Fredette.

Call-ups
All NBA D-League prospects — players whose rights are not owned by NBA teams — are free agents and are eligible to be called up to the NBA.

2014–15
 Guard Langston Galloway received a 10-day contract with the New York Knicks on January 7, 2015.

2015–16
 Forward Thanasis Antetokounmpo received a 10-day contract with the New York Knicks on January 29, 2016. 
 Guard Jimmer Fredette received a 10-day contract with the New York Knicks on February 22, 2016.

2016–17
 Guard Chasson Randle received a 10-day contract with the Philadelphia 76ers on January 10, 2017.

2017–18
 Guard Trey Burke signed for the remainder of the season with the New York Knicks on January 14, 2018.
 Forward Nigel Hayes received a 10-day contract with the Los Angeles Lakers on January 19, 2018.

Season-by-season

Current roster

Head coaches

NBA affiliates
New York Knicks (2014–present)

References

External links
Official Website of the Westchester Knicks

 
Basketball teams established in 2014
Sports in Westchester County, New York
Basketball teams in the New York metropolitan area
2014 establishments in New York (state)
Madison Square Garden Sports